The American School of Modern Music, located in Paris, France, is a private post-secondary institution offering high-level music education.

About 
From its creation in 1982 by the American drummer Stephen Carbonara to this day, The American School of Modern Music is an internationally oriented school that has always trained a high percentage of foreign students. In addition to its ties with the United States, the school has built its reputation on the exceptional level of its teaching staff, the quality of its graduates and their international presence in all areas of music: musicians, singers, arrangers, composers, engineers, producers, teachers and other music professionals (see former students below).

The American School of Modern Music is affiliated with two international associations, IASJ : International Association of School Jazz  and the JEN : Jazz Education Network.

The school offers three different majors during the final year of study: Performance Major for students who wish to focus on their instrument, Arranging and Composition Major, and Production & Music Technology Major. It is also possible to combine different Majors (Double Major).

Faculty (non exhaustive list) 

The American School of Modern Music distinguishes itself by its commitment to offer a faculty of outstanding musicians chosen not only for their links with the United States but also for their standing as professional musicians, renowned and active in the international music industry:

 Cédric Hanriot (Pianist/Composer), graduate from Berklee College of Music, recordings with artists including Diane Reeves, Herbie Hancock, Dee Dee Bridgewater, John Patitucci, Joe Lovano, Meshell Ndegeocello, Terri Lyne Carrington, Logan Richardson, Nelson Veras, Alex Han, Melissa Aldana, Tineke Postma, Otis Brown III, Lulu Gainsbourg, Donny McCaslin, Clarence Penn, Jason Palmer, Michael Janisch, Jeff Ballard.
 Malik "Magic Malik" Mezzadri (Flutist/Composer), collaborations and recordings with artists including Steve Coleman, Saint-Germain, Laurent Garnier, FFF, Malka Family, le Groove Gang de Julien Loureau, Matthieu Chedid, Bumcello, Camille, Pierrick Pedron, Aka Moon, Booster, Hocus Pocus, Air, and Oumou Sangaré.
 Brad Thomas Ackley (Producer/Composer/Multi-instrumentalist), graduate from Berklee College of Music, work on The Matrix Reloaded, Never on the First Night, One Wild Moment, MTV's The Hills, Renault, Lacoste, Collette, Adidas, IKEA. Collaborations and recordings with Matthieu Chedid (producer of the album (Îl) and Victoire de la musique for best show/tour 2014.
 Benjamin Henocq (Drummer/Composer), leader of the band Prysm with five albums on the Blue Note Records (EMI). Collaborations and recordings with artists including Michel Legrand, John McLaughlin, Didier Lockwood, Lee Konitz, Jean-Michel Pilc, Marc Ducret, Philip Catherine, Louis Winsberg, Martial Solal, Henri Texier, Michel Portal, Michelle & Jon Hendricks, Nelson Veras, Graig Bailey, Joe Locke, James Taylor, Kenny Garrett, Stefano Di Battista, Wdr and Lincoln Center orchestra Big band, Ravi Coltrane, Mark Turner, Rosario Giuliani, and Bob Mintzer.
 Guillaume Estace (Guitarist/Composer), graduate "summa cum laude" from Berklee College of Music. Co-director of the American School of Modern Music and creator of the Guitar-Sessions, collaborations with artists including Lulu Gainsbourg, Vanessa Paradis, Matthieu Chedid, Ayo, Jane Birkin, Angelo Debarre, Stan Harrison, Gary Georgett , Caroline Bugala.
 Jonathan Joubert (Guitarist/Composer), co-director of the American School of Modern Music, collaborations with Mark Turner, Baptiste Trotignon, Benjamin Henocq, Tchavolo Schmitt, Boulou Ferré, Stéphane Wrembel, Denis Chang, Ben Powell, Florin Niculescu, Pierre Manetti, Cédric Hanriot among others.

Guest Lecturers 
 Lou Tavano (singer)
 James Robbins (Bass player/Composer), collaborations with Nikolas Anadolis, Stéphane Wrembel, Joseph Doubleday, Jonathan Joubert, Michel Camilo, Javier Rosario, Les Paul, Thank You Scientist.
 Fabien Aubry (Pianist/Producer) teacher at Berklee College of Music.

Famous alumni 
 Lionel Loueke
 Alexandre Astier director of the TV series Kaamelott
 Lou Tavano
 Norma Ray
 Stéphane Wrembel
 Modjo
 Cyrille Aimée
 John Ellis
 Alexandre Destrez, pianist on St Germain's albums Tourist and Boulevard

Former teachers 
 Steve Carbonara (1982-2004 - Founder)
 Dominic Alldis - 1990s
 Steve Browman 1994-2008
 Susan Calkins - 1980s
 Keri Chryst 2005-2016
 Christopher Culpo (2008-2016)
 François Fichu (1985-2016)
 William Fitzpatrick - 1990s
 Peter Giron (1988-2016)
 Eddie Goldstein - 1980s
 Craig Goodman - 1990s
 Phil Hilfiker (2002-2016)
 Jeff Jordan - 1990s
 Joe Makholm 1985-2001
 Rick Margitza 2008-2016
 George Menousek - 1990s
 Shannon Murray - 1990s
 Mike O'Neil 1990-2008
 Stephen "Sooch" SanSouci - 1980s
 Zack Settle - 1990s
 Bernard Vidal (2003-2016)
 Brad Wheeler 1998-2004
 Tony Saba (1999-2016)

External links 
 School website
 http://www.letudiant.fr/etudes/international/

Music schools in Paris